The 2021–22 season was the 117th season in the existence of Leicester City F.C. and the club's eighth consecutive season in the top flight of English football. In addition to the domestic league, Leicester City participated in this season's editions of the FA Cup, the EFL Cup, the FA Community Shield, the UEFA Europa League and the UEFA Europa Conference League.

Kits

Management team

Players

Squad information
Players and squad numbers last updated on 22 May 2022. Appearances include all competitions.Note: Flags indicate national team as has been defined under FIFA eligibility rules. Players may hold more than one non-FIFA nationality.

Transfers

In

Out

Loan in

Loan out

Pre-season friendlies
The Foxes announced they would have friendly matches against Burton Albion, Wycombe Wanderers, Queens Park Rangers and Villarreal as part of the club's pre-season preparations.

Competitions

Overview

Premier League

League table

Results summary

Results by matchday

Matches
The league fixtures were announced on 16 June 2021.

FA Cup

Leicester City entered the competition at the third round stage and on 6 December 2021 were drawn at home to Watford.

EFL Cup

Leicester City entered the competition in the third round due to participation in UEFA competitions and were drawn away to Millwall and then at home to Brighton & Hove Albion in the fourth round.

FA Community Shield

UEFA Europa League

Group stage

Leicester City were drawn against Italian side Napoli, Russian side Spartak Moscow and Polish side Legia Warsaw in the group stages.

UEFA Europa Conference League

Knockout phase

Knockout round play-offs
The knockout round play-offs draw was held on 13 December 2021.

Round of 16
The round of 16 draw was held on 25 February 2022.

Quarter-finals
The draw for the quarter-finals was held on 18 March 2022.

Semi-finals
The draw for the semi-finals was held on 18 March 2022, after the quarter-final draw.

Squad statistics

Appearances
Italics indicate a loaned player

|-
|colspan="16"|Out on loan:

|-
|colspan="16"|No longer at the club:

|}

Goalscorers

See also
 2021–22 in English football
 List of Leicester City F.C. seasons

References

Leicester City F.C. seasons
Leicester City
Leicester City